Sigfrid Siwertz, born 24 January 1882 in Stockholm, died 26 November 1970, was a Swedish writer.

As a writer Siwertz is associated as a representative of the Swedish realism literature of the 1910s. A prolific writer he wrote poetry, several plays and many short stories, but is best known for his novels. His early novel Mälarpirater (1911, "Pirates of Mälaren"), a story about three boys adventures on a stolen sailing boat in Mälaren, is regarded as a minor classic in Swedish literature and was for long widely read in Swedish schools. His masterpiece, however, is the novel Selambs, published in two parts in 1920. Acknowledged as one of the best critical depictions of the bourgeoisie in Swedish literature it was adapted to a television series in 1979.

In 1932 Siwertz was elected a member of the Swedish Academy. He was a member of the Nobel Prize committee from 1942 to 1963.

References
Sigfrid Siwertz Svenskt biografiskt lexikon

External links
 

Swedish writers
1882 births
1970 deaths
Members of the Swedish Academy